The 2010–11 Boston College Eagles men's ice hockey team represented Boston College in the 2010–11 NCAA Division I men's ice hockey season. The team was coached by Jerry York, '67, his seventeenth season behind the bench at Boston College.  The Eagles played their home games at Kelley Rink on the campus of Boston College, competing in Hockey East.

Boston College entered the 2010–2011 season as reigning National Champions, having defeated Wisconsin in the 2010 Frozen Four Championship Game.  The Eagles also began the season as defending Hockey East tournament and Beanpot champions, having alo won both tournaments during the 2009–2010 season.  The Eagles raised their 2010 National Championship banner in the home opener against Merrimack on October 29, 2010.  BC skated to a 3–2 victory.

On February 14, 2011, BC defeated Northeastern 7–6 in overtime on a goal by junior forward Jimmy Hayes in the Beanpot Championship.  It was the first time the Eagles have won back-to-back Beanpots (having also won in 2010) since the team won three-in-a-row from 1963–1965.  Sophomore forward Chris Kreider was named tournament MVP.

BC clinched the Hockey East regular season crown by sweeping New Hampshire in the final series of the regular season.  It was the Eagle's record eleventh Hockey East regular season title and the team's first since 2005.  The Eagles also repeated as Hockey East Tournament champions, defeating Merrimack 5–3 in the tournament championship game.  It was also BC's tenth Hockey Tournament Tournament title, a conference record.  Junior Cam Atkinson was named tournament MVP.

The Eagles entered the 2011 NCAA Tournament as a number one seed in the West Regional played in St. Louis at the Scottrade Center.  BC failed to defend their 2010 National Championship, losing in the first round to fourth-seeded Colorado College 8–4.

Offseason
April 24, 2010: Freshman hockey players Parker Milner, Philip Samulesson, and Patrick Wey were involved in an accident when the SUV they were passengers in was hit by a trolley close to the South Street T-stop near Boston College.  Players were treated for minor injuries.

September 13, 2010: Members of the 2009–2010 National Championship team were honored at the White House with other champion student athletes.  Players visited the Walter Reed Medical Center, met with Senators Scott Brown and John Kerry of Massachusetts, and were addressed by President Barack Obama on the South Lawn.

Recruiting
Boston College added four freshmen for the 2010–2011 season: Isaac MacLeod, a Canadian defenseman who previously played for Penticton Vees in the BCHL; Patrick Brown, a forward from Michigan who is the nephew of BC assistant coach Greg Brown; Needham-born forward Bill Arnold, who captured a gold medal with the USA U-18 team at the 2010 IIHF World U18 Championships in Minsk, Belarus; and Kevin Hayes of Dorchester, MA, a first round pick of the Chicago Blackhawks in the 2010 NHL Entry Draft and younger brother of junior forward Jimmy Hayes.  A fifth recruit, Cody Ferriero, decommitted in August and chose instead to play hockey at Northeastern.

2010–2011 Roster

Departures from 2009–2010 Team
 Ben Smith F – Graduation
 Matt Price, F – Graduation
 Matt Lombardi, F – Graduation
 Carl Sneep, D – Graduation
 Malcolm Lyles, D – Currently playing with the Vernon Vipers of the BCHL

2010–2011 Eagles
As of September 14, 2010

Standings
On September 29, the Eagles were selected as the preseason favorite to win the league regular-season title in Hockey East Coach's Poll.

Schedule

2010–2011 Regular season

All times Eastern

Rankings from USCHO.com/CBS College Sports Poll

* = Hockey East Conference Play

% = 2010 Ledyard National Bank Classic in Hanover, NH

Beanpot = 59th Annual Beanpot Tournament in Boston, MA

On December 7, sophomores Chris Kreider, Philip Samuelsson, Brian Dumoulin, and Patrick Wey were named 29-man preliminary roster for the 2011 United States Junior National Team.
On December 22, sophomores Chris Kreider, Brian Dumoulin, and Patrick Wey were selected to the final 22-man roster for the 2011 United States Junior National Team to compete at the 2011 World Junior Ice Hockey Championships from December 26, 2010 to Jan. 5, 2011, in Buffalo and Niagara, New York.
On January 22, Jerry York notched his 400th win as Boston College head coach, and 867th overall, with a 5–3 victory over UMass Lowell at Kelley Rink.
On February 14, BC won its sixteenth Beanpot title by defeating Northeastern 7–6 in overtime of the championship game.
On February 18, BC clinched home ice for the quarterfinal round of the Hockey East playoffs with a 7–7 tie versus Northeastern.
On March 5, in the final game of the regular season versus New Hampshire, the Eagles won 4–3 at the Whittemore Center to win its record eleventh Hockey East regular season championship and the school's first since 2005.

2011 Post-Season

All times Eastern

On March 12, the senior class of Joe Whitney, Brian Gibbons, and John Muse recorded their 100th career win in defeating Massachusetts 4–2 in the Hockey East tournament quarterfinals, the trio's final game at Kelley Rink.
On March 19, the Eagles won their league-record tenth Hockey East Tournament title by defeating Merrimack 5–3 in the final.

Awards and honors

2010 Lester Patrick Trophy Recipient
Jerry York

2010–11 Norman F. Dailey Team MVP
Cam Atkinson, F (shared)
John Muse, G (shared)

2010–11 John "Snooks" Kelley Memorial Award
Brian Gibbons, F

William J. Flynn Coaches Award
Joe Whitney, F

Parker-York Award
Jim Logue 

ACHA All-Americans
Brian Dumoulin, D (First team)
Cam Atkinson, F (First team)
John Muse, G (Second team)

All-USCHO Teams
Brian Dumoulin, D (First team)
Cam Atkinson, F (First team)
John Muse, G (Second team)

2011 Walter Brown Award
John Muse, G 

2011 Hockey Humanitarian Award
Brooks Dyroff, F 

Beanpot MVP
Chris Kreider, F

2011 Hockey East Tournament MVP
Cam Atkinson, F

2011 Hockey East All-Tournament Team
John Muse, G
Tommy Cross, D
Brian Gibbons, F
Cam Atkinson, F

2010–11 Hockey East Coach of the Year
Jerry York

2010–11 Hockey East First-Team All-Stars
John Muse, G
Brian Dumoulin, D
Cam Atkinson, F

2010–11 Hockey East Second-Team All-Stars
Brian Gibbons, F

2010–11 Hockey East Best Defensive Defenseman
Brian Dumoulin

2010–11 Hockey East Goaltending Champion
John Muse – 1.84 GAA, .933 save%

2010–11 Hockey East All-Rookie Team
Bill Arnold, F

2010–11 Hockey East Academic All-Stars
Isaac Macleod, D
Patrick Wey, D
Bill Arnold, F
Patrick Brown, F
Brooks Dyroff, F

Hockey East Player of the Month
Brian Gibbons, F – December 2010
Cam Atkinson, F – March 2011 (Shared with Ryan Flanigan, F, Merrimack)

Hockey East Goaltender of the Month
John Muse – November 2010

Hockey East Team of the Week
Week of October 18, 2010
Week of November 22, 2010
Week of December 6, 2010
Week of January 3, 2011
Week of January 24, 2011
Week of March 7, 2011
Week of March 21, 2011

Hockey East Player of the Week
Jimmy Hayes, F – Week of October 18, 2010, Week of March 14, 2011 (shared with Ryan Flanigan, F, Merrimack)
Steven Whitney, F – Week of December 6, 2010 (shared with Mike Sislo, F, New Hampshire)
Cam Atkinson, F – Week of March 7, 2011, Week of March 21, 2011

Hockey East Defensive Player of the Week
John Muse, G – Week of October 11, 2010, Week of November 22, 2010, Week of February 14, 2011
Brian Dumoulin, D – Week of January 10, 2011 (shared with Joe Cannata, G, Merrimack)
Tommy Cross, D – Week of March 21, 2011

Hockey East Rookie of the Week
Bill Arnold, F – Week of January 3, 2011

See also
2010–11 Boston College Eagles women's ice hockey season

References

External links
BC Men's Hockey Home Page
BC Men's Hockey Page on USCHO

Boston College Eagles men's ice hockey seasons
Boston College Eagles
Boston College Eagles
Boston College Eagles men's ice hockey season
Boston College Eagles men's ice hockey season
Boston College Eagles men's ice hockey season
Boston College Eagles men's ice hockey season